Ulrike Werner is an Austrian retired slalom canoeist who competed in the mid-1950s. She won a bronze medal in the folding K-1 team event at the 1953 ICF Canoe Slalom World Championships in Meran.

References

Austrian female canoeists
Possibly living people
Year of birth missing
Medalists at the ICF Canoe Slalom World Championships